Zahari Kechik (born 1960) is a Malaysian politician. He was elected Perikatan Nasional MP for Jeli in the 2022 general election.

References

See also 
 Members of the Dewan Rakyat, 15th Malaysian Parliament

Living people
1960 births
21st-century Malaysian politicians
Members of the Dewan Rakyat
Malaysian United Indigenous Party politicians
Place of birth missing (living people)
Date of birth missing (living people)